Sir John Barrington, 3rd Baronet (1605 – 24 March 1683) of Barrington Hall, Essex was an English lawyer and politician who sat in the House of Commons at various times between 1645 and 1679.

Life
Barrington was the eldest son of Sir Thomas Barrington, 2nd Baronet and his first wife Frances Gobert, daughter of John Gobert. He was educated at Trinity College, Cambridge. In 1635, after being called to the bar from Gray's Inn, Barrington was knighted at Whitehall, and in 1644, he succeeded his father as baronet. His father died heavily in debt, and as a result the son later spent some time in the Fleet Prison. Barrington sent a petition to parliament alleging that his stepmother Judith Barrington was removing timber from the family estate to sell and that this damaged its value. There were a large number of legal disputes although Judith's biographer, Caroline M. K. Bowden, believes that his stepmother had the expertise and that she was in the right.

Barrington was nominated to be one of the High Court Judges in the trial of King Charles I of England in 1649, Barrington, although he was a family connection of Oliver Cromwell. He refused to attend its meetings and declined to sign the warrant for the king's execution. From 1645 to 1648 and again from 1660 to 1679, he was a Member of Parliament (MP) for Newtown. He was a rather inactive member, due partly to his increasingly ill health. In 1654 he was High Sheriff of Essex and also High Sheriff of Hertfordshire.
 
Barrington was married to Dorothy Lytton, daughter of Sir William Lytton. They had five sons and nine daughters. Barrington was buried at Hatfield Broadoak, a week after his death. His eldest son had died in his lifetime, and thus the baronetcy passed in turn to his grandsons John and Charles.

References

1605 births
1683 deaths
Alumni of Trinity College, Cambridge
Members of Gray's Inn
Baronets in the Baronetage of England
High Sheriffs of Essex
High Sheriffs of Hertfordshire
English MPs 1640–1648
English MPs 1660
English MPs 1661–1679
Members of Parliament for the Isle of Wight